Lemurs are strepsirrhine primates, all species of which are endemic to Madagascar. However, recently extinct species grew much larger. As of 2010, five families, 15 genera, and 101 species and subspecies of lemur were formally recognized.<ref name="LoM3_pgs101-103List|classified]] eight as Critically Endangered, 18 as Endangered, 15 as Vulnerable, four as Near Threatened, eight as Least Concern and 41 as Data Deficient; seven were yet to be evaluated. From 2000 through 2008, 39 new species were described and nine other taxa resurrected. By 2014, the number of species plus subspecies recognized had increased to 113; of the 105 species then known, the IUCN classified 24 as critically endangered, 49 as endangered, 20 as vulnerable, three as near threatened, three as least concern and four as data deficient; two were yet to be evaluated.

The number of lemur species is likely to continue growing in the coming years, as field studies, cytogenetic and molecular genetic research continues. There is not complete agreement over the latest revisions to lemur taxonomy, with some experts preferring an estimated 50 lemur species. The debates are likely to continue, as some scholars label the explosive growth of species numbers as taxonomic inflation. In many cases, classifications will ultimately depend upon which species concept is used. In the case of the lemurs of Madagascar, which have suffered extensively from deforestation and habitat fragmentation, nearly 70% of all species were either endangered or critically endangered as of 2014, most have yet to be extensively studied, and nearly all populations are in decline. For these reasons, taxonomists and conservationists favor splitting them into separate species to develop an effective strategy for the conservation of the full range of lemur diversity. Implicitly, this means that full species status will help grant genetically distinct populations added environmental protection.

At least 17 species and eight genera are believed to have become extinct in the 2,000 years since humans first arrived in Madagascar. The largest known subfossil lemur was Archaeoindris fontoynonti, a giant sloth lemur, which weighed more than a modern female gorilla. The extinction of the largest lemurs is often attributed to predation by humans and possibly habitat destruction. Since all extinct lemurs were not only large (and thus ideal prey species), but also slow-moving (and thus more vulnerable to human predation), their presumably slow-reproducing and low-density populations were least likely to survive the introduction of humans. Gradual changes in climate have also been blamed, and may have played a minor role; however since the largest lemurs also survived the climatic changes from previous ice ages and only disappeared following the arrival of humans, it is unlikely that climatic change was largely responsible.

There is strong evidence of extensive declines in extant populations since the introductions of humans, particularly among the larger and more specialized lemurs. As long as habitats continue to shrink, degrade and fragment, extinctions are likely to continue.

Taxonomic classification

Lemurs are classified under eight families, three of which are extinct:

Family: †Archaeolemuridae : monkey lemurs
Genus: †Archaeolemur (2 extinct species)
Genus: †Hadropithecus (1 extinct species)
Family: Cheirogaleidae
Genus: Allocebus: hairy-eared dwarf lemur (1 extant species)
Genus: Cheirogaleus: dwarf lemurs (9 extant species)
Genus: Microcebus: mouse lemurs (24 extant species)
Genus: Mirza: giant mouse lemurs (2 extant species)
Genus: Phaner: fork-marked lemurs (4 extant species)
Family: Daubentoniidae: aye-aye
Genus: Daubentonia (1 extant species, 1 extinct species)
Family: Indriidae
Genus: Avahi: woolly lemurs (9 extant species)
Genus: Indri: indri (1 extant species)
Genus: Propithecus: sifakas (9 extant species)
Family: Lemuridae
Genus: Eulemur: true lemurs (12 extant species)
Genus: Hapalemur: bamboo lemurs (6 extant species, 3 extant subspecies)
Genus: Lemur: ring-tailed lemur (1 extant species)
Genus: †Pachylemur (2 extinct species)
Genus: Varecia: ruffed lemurs (2 extant species, 3 extant subspecies)
Family: Lepilemuridae: sportive lemurs
Genus: Lepilemur (26 extant species)
Family: †Megaladapidae: koala lemurs
Genus: †Megaladapis (3 extinct species)
Family: †Palaeopropithecidae: sloth lemurs
Genus: †Archaeoindris (1 extinct species)
Genus: †Babakotia (1 extinct species)
Genus: †Mesopropithecus (3 extinct species)
Genus: †Palaeopropithecus (3 extinct species)

The placement of lemurs within the order Strepsirrhini is currently under debate, although both sides agree upon the same phylogenetic tree.

 Order Primates
 Suborder Strepsirrhini: lemurs, galagos, and lorisids
 Infraorder Lemuriformes
 Superfamily Lemuroidea
 Family †Archaeolemuridae
 Family Cheirogaleidae
 Family Daubentoniidae
 Family Indriidae
 Family Lemuridae
 Family Lepilemuridae
 Family †Megaladapidae
 Family †Palaeopropithecidae
 Superfamily Lorisoidea
 Suborder Haplorrhini: tarsiers, monkeys and apes

Key

Extant species

All lemurs belong to the suborder Strepsirrhini within the order Primates. The 101 extant species and subspecies are divided among 5 families and 15 genera. Most are highly arboreal and activity patterns range widely from nocturnal to diurnal to cathemeral. Having diversified over millions of years to fill every ecological niche, diets also vary widely, though fruit, leaves, and insects make up the majority of the diet for most species.

Family: Cheirogaleidae
Family Cheirogaleidae consists of the mouse lemurs (smallest of all primates), the dwarf lemurs, and the fork-marked lemurs and their allies. There are 37 extant species.

Family: Lemuridae
Family Lemuridae consists of the ring-tailed lemur, the brown lemurs, the bamboo lemurs and the ruffed lemurs. There are 21 extant species and six subspecies.

Family: Lepilemuridae
Family Lepilemuridae consists solely of the sportive lemurs. As of 2014, there are 26 extant species.

Family: Indriidae
Family Indriidae consists of the indri (the largest extant lemur), the woolly lemurs and the sifakas. There are 19 extant species.

Family: Daubentoniidae

Family Daubentoniidae contains only one surviving species, of the aye-aye. Wide-ranging genetic studies have shown that it separated from the ancestral lemurs long before any other branch of the modern Lemuriformes.

Unconfirmed species
Reports of new species continue to trickle in from the field.  However, these reports require further scientific evaluation before their claims can be verified.

Extinct species

All known extinct lemurs from Madagascar are known from recent, subfossil remains. Conditions for fossilization were not ideal on the island, so little is known about ancestral lemur populations. All known extinct lemurs are thought to have died out after the arrival of humans.

See also
List of mammals of Madagascar
List of primates

Footnotes
In 2008, the red lemur, Eulemur rufus, was split into two species, Eulemur rufus (red lemur) and Eulemur rufifrons (red-fronted lemur). Also, Eulemur rufus was previously known as the red-fronted lemur, but was renamed the red lemur, while Eulemur rufifrons assumed its former name.
Formerly referred to as Eulemur albocollaris or white-collared brown lemur, but was changed in 2008.
This extinction date for Babakotia radofilai is based on a single radiocarbon date from one specimen. For this reason, it is hard to tell when this species became extinct or how it is related to other lemur species.
Average weights reported for this species are based on very small sample sizes or are general ranges for its genus and thus require further research.

Notes

References

External links
 Too Many New Lemur Species? – Interview with Anne Yoder, Director of the Duke Lemur Center

'
Lemur
lemur
'lemur
'lemur
'lemur